Olearia ramosissima, commonly known as much-branched daisy bush, is a species of flowering plant in the family Asteraceae and is endemic to continental Australia. It is a straggly shrub with densely-crowded, elliptic, egg-shaped or triangular leaves, and blue to violet and blue or yellow, daisy-like inflorescences.

Description
The upper surface of the leaves is minutely pimply, the lower surface covered with greyish, woolly hairs. The heads or daisy-like "flowers" are usually arranged singly on the ends of branches and are sessile,  in diameter with 8 to 13 blue to violet ray florets, surrounding 11 to 15 blue or yellow disc florets. Flowering occurs from June to August and the fruit is a silky-hairy achene, the pappus with 27 to 47 bristles.

Taxonomy
This daisy was first formally described in 1836 by Augustin Pyramus de Candolle who gave it the name Eurybia ramosissima in his Prodromus Systematis Naturalis Regni Vegetabilis. In 1867, George Bentham changed the name to Olearia ramosissima in Flora Australiensis. The specific epithet (ramosissima) means "much-branched".

Distribution and habitat
Much-branched daisy bush has a disjunct distribution, occurring in the south-west of Western Australia, and in south-east Queensland and northern New South Wales in eastern Australia. In eastern Australia it grows in forest, mainly on the slopes and tablelands north from Narrabri. In Western Australia it grows on undulating plains on clay flats in the Coolgardie, Esperance Plains, Hampton and Mallee bioregions in the south of that state.

References

ramosissima
Asterales of Australia
Flora of New South Wales
Flora of Queensland
Eudicots of Western Australia
Plants described in 1836
Taxa named by Augustin Pyramus de Candolle